Hymenobacter psychrophilus  is a Gram-negative, psychrophilic, aerobic, rod-shaped and non-motile bacterium from the genus of Hymenobacter which has been isolated from the soil of an industrial estate in Bozen, Italy.

References

External links
Type strain of Hymenobacter psychrophilus at BacDive -  the Bacterial Diversity Metadatabase	

psychrophilus
Bacteria described in 2011
Psychrophiles